Toveh Sorkhak-e Sofla (also Romanized as Toveh Sorkhak-e Soflá; also known as Tovasorkhak-e Soflá and Tūh-e Sorkhak) is a village in Homeyl Rural District, Homeyl District, Eslamabad-e Gharb County, Kermanshah Province, Iran. At the 2006 census, its population was 706, in 147 families.

References 

Populated places in Eslamabad-e Gharb County